This is a list of black metal bands (letters L through Z) including bands that have at some point in their careers played black metal.

L

 Lengsel
 Leviathan
 Lifelover
 Limbonic Art
 Lord Belial
 The Lord Diabolus
 Lord Kaos
Leviathan
 Lover of Sin
 Ludicra
 Lux Occulta

M

 Månegarm
 Manes
 Marduk
 Master's Hammer
 Mayhem
 The Meads of Asphodel
 Melechesh
 Mercyful Fate
 Mezzerschmitt
 Mgła
 Mithotyn
 Moonsorrow
 Moonspell
 Morbid
 Morgul
 Moribund Oblivion
 Mutilator
 Mütiilation
 Myrkgrav
 Myrkskog
 Mystic Circle

N

 Nachtmystium
 Naer Mataron
 Nagelfar
 Naglfar
 Nahemah
 Nargaroth
 Nattefrost
 Nazxul
 Necrodeath
 Necromantia
 Necrophobic
 Nefastus Dies
 Negură Bunget
 Nifelheim
 Nightfall
 Nocturnal Breed
 Nokturnal Mortum
 Nortt
 Notre Dame

O

 O, Majestic Winter
 Oathean
 Obscene Eulogy
 Obscurity
 Obtained Enslavement
 Obtest
 Ofermod
 Old Funeral
 Old Man's Child
 Ondskapt
 Opera IX
 Ophthalamia
 Oranssi Pazuzu
 Orcustus
 Order from Chaos
 Ov Hell

P

 Panopticon
 Pantheon I
 Paradox
 Paysage D'Hiver
 Peccatum
 Peste Noire
 Primordial
 Profanatica

R

 Ragnarok
 Ram-Zet
 Revenge
 Rotting Christ
 Rudra
 Ruins

S

 Sabbat
 Sacramentum 
 Salem
 Samael
 Sanctifica
 Sarcófago
 Sargeist
 Satanic Slaughter
 Satanic Warmaster
 Satyricon
 Schaliach
 Sear Bliss
 Secrets of the Moon
 Selfmindead
 Sepultura
 Setherial
 Shaytan
 Shade Empire
 Shining
 Siebenbürgen
 Sigh
 Skeletonwitch
 Skitliv
 Skyforger
 Slavia
 Slechtvalk
 Sodom
 Solefald
 Sólstafir
 Sonic Reign
 Spektr
 The Stone
 Stormlord
 Striborg
 Sturmgeist
 Summoning
 Sunn O)))
 Susperia
 Svartsyn
 Sympathy

T

 Taake
 Teitanblood
 Theatres des Vampires
 Thorns
 Thou Art Lord
 Thronar
 Thy Serpent
 Thyrane
 Thyrfing
 Tiamat
 Tormentor
 Toxic Holocaust
 Trail of Tears
 Trelldom
 Tribes of Caïn
 Tristwood
 Troll
 Tsjuder
 Tvangeste
 Twilight
 Twilight Ophera
 Twin Obscenity
 Tyrant

U

 Ulver
 Unanimated
 Unexpect
 Unholy
 Urgehal

V

 Vaakevandring
 Vardøger
 Valhall
 Ved Buens Ende
 Velvet Cacoon
 Venom
 Vesania
 Vesperian Sorrow
 Viking Crown
  Vintersorg
 Vital Remains
 Vlad Tepes
 Von
 Vondur
 Vorkreist
 Vreid
 Vudmurk
 Vulcano

W

 Watain
 Weakling
 Windir
 Wintersun
 Witchery
 Witchfynde
 Witchmaster
 Wolfchant
 Wolves in the Throne Room
 Woods of Ypres
 Wykked Wytch
 Wyrd

X

 Xasthur

Y

Z

 Zuriaake
 Zweizz
 Zyklon
 Zyklon-B

See also

List of black metal bands, 0–K
List of heavy metal bands
List of doom metal bands
List of death metal bands
List of folk metal bands
List of thrash metal bands

References

Lists of black metal bands